Stephen Gendin (February 20, 1966 – July 19, 2000) was an American AIDS activist in the late 1980s and the 1990s, whose advocacy is credited with having promoted changes in government policy that improved the lives of HIV positive people. He was involved with the ACT UP,  ActUp/RI, Sex Panic!, the Community Prescription Service, POZ Magazine and the Radical Faeries. HIV positive himself, he dedicated the last fifteen years of his life to helping care for those also living with HIV/AIDS.  He was a founder and the chief executive of the Community Prescription Service, an organization that distributes information designed to help people with HIV and AIDS as well as supplying medication via mail order.

Early life
Gendin was raised in Ypsilanti, Michigan. He was Valedictorian of his high school and then attended Brown University in Providence, Rhode Island, where he learned that he was HIV positive as a first-year student in 1985. He aggressively experimented with new medications for HIV and maintained a healthy and active lifestyle for many years until his death.

AIDS Activism
Gendin was a recognized genius who was offered membership of Mensa. After learning at the age of 19 that he was infected with HIV, he quickly became at least as well informed about the latest HIV medical research as many leading HIV specialists, and remained so until his death, despite his lack of a formal medical education. He understood (as few others do to this day) that HIV diagnostic tests detect not the HIV virus but HIV's human antibodies, which do not exist in sufficient quantity to generate a positive HIV test result until between two and twenty-four weeks after HIV infection. During this immensely variable window period, people infected with HIV test negative because they have very few antibodies fighting the virus, as a direct consequence of which they also have very high levels of HIV in their bodies. These recently infected persons are usually unaware that they are infected at all, and firmly though wrongly believe that recent HIV negative test results prove that they are not infected and cannot infect others.

During his lifetime, Gendin was largely ignored in warning about the high risk of transmission from persons testing negative during the window period. Medical science has since confirmed that those recently infected with HIV who still test HIV negative are dangerously contagious for HIV, because of their much higher HIV viral levels compared to persons outside the window period. The latter group's positive HIV test results indicate that HIV antibodies are suppressing (though never eliminating) HIV levels in their bodies, therefore reducing their infectiousness, which is reduced still further when they commence antiretroviral treatment.

Journalism
Gendin was a regular contributor to the magazine POZ. He used his column to discuss in graphic detail the toll that AIDS took on his body, as well as sharing his fantasies of political assassination and the deeply conflicted feelings of guilt and pleasure that he experienced after having unprotected sex. Although his confession of his sometimes reckless behavior caused outrage among many gay men at the time, after his death, many recognized that his controversial disclosures provoked life-saving awareness among gay men of the risks involved in increasingly widespread but rarely discussed practices of unprotected intercourse.

Death and legacy
Gendin died on July 19, 2000, at the age of 34, from AIDS-induced lymphoma. In the summer of 2000, he was eulogized in a widely reprinted speech by Larry Kramer. The chemotherapy he was receiving to treat the disease put him into cardiac arrest. His activism was pivotal in reforming the FDA drug approval process to expedite HIV and AIDS patients' access to more effective anti-retroviral treatments. Because of his efforts, some people living with HIV today believe that Gendin was a "superhero".

Publications

Book Chapter

POZ Magazine Articles

References

External links
 Stephen Gendin Papers (MS 1963). Manuscripts and Archives, Yale University Library.

1966 births
2000 deaths
HIV/AIDS activists
AIDS-related deaths in New York (state)
American activists
Brown University alumni
American gay writers
LGBT people from Michigan
Radical Faeries members
20th-century American non-fiction writers
20th-century American male writers
American male non-fiction writers
20th-century American LGBT people